The 2015 season for the  cycling team began in January at the Tour de San Luis. As a UCI WorldTeam, they are  obligated to send a squad to every event in the UCI World Tour.

After months of speculation, Garmin-Sharp and  announced on 20 August 2014 that for the 2015 season the two teams will merge. The team is more a continuity of the Garmin team managed by Slipstream Sports, who will remain the managerial organisation behind the team, with Cannondale becoming the team's title sponsor and bike supplier, and Garmin remaining a key team sponsor.

Team roster 

Riders who joined the team for the 2015 season

Riders who left the team during or after the 2014 season

Season victories

National, Continental and World champions 2015

Footnotes

References

External links
 

2015 Cannondale-Garmin
2015 road cycling season by team
2015 in American sports